Ayanna Porter (born November 27, 1976), better known by her stage name INOJ, is an American singer and songwriter. Her 1997 debut single, "Love You Down", a cover of the 1986 Ready for the World hit, reached number 25 in the United States. Her 1998 debut album was also named Ready for the World. INOJ released a cover version of Cyndi Lauper's "Time After Time" under Columbia Records in 1998, which was a top 10 hit in the United States, Canada and New Zealand. She also released a version of Anita Ward's "Ring My Bell".

Early career
INOJ was born in Madison, Wisconsin. As baby, she started singing War's "The Cisco Kid" in her crib before she was talking. She sang in the high school choir. She wanted to have a singing career, but her parents convinced her to pursue engineering, another passion. She decided to attend the University of Baltimore because it was near Washington, D.C. and not too far from New York City, and she had a better chance of connecting with music producers. In her sophomore year of college, she joined a girl group called Spellbound, who got signed to a major label recording contract. The group disbanded, and she became a songwriter.

She was asked by So So Def producers to sing a reference track for someone else to hear and emulate, and she recorded her vocals to "Love You Down". The producers immediately put her version out as the final product. At this time, she created her stage name INOJ, pronounced "eye know jay". The name is "Joni" spelled backwards; her birth name is Ayanna and she had been nicknamed Yanni, but she spelled the nickname Joni for personal style.

Musical style
When discussing her musical style in an interview with Billboard, INOJ stated that she doesn't identify with one particular genre of music. According to her, "I try not to classify my sound, but I think I would call myself rhythm and pop instead of R&B." She continued saying, "R&B is more street today than rhythm and blues, and I'm definitely not urban, so I guess I've come up with a new category of my own."

INOJ said she was raised listening to artists such as the Carpenters and Sandy Patty. She is influenced by artists Minnie Riperton, Stevie Wonder, Chicago, Michael Jackson, Backstreet Boys, NSYNC, Shania Twain, Shawn Colvin and Aaliyah.

Discography

Albums
1999: Ready for the World

Singles
1997: "Love You Down" (US #25, 20 weeks)
1998: "Time After Time" (US #6, 16 weeks)
1999: "Ring My Bell"
2007: "Nine to Five"
2008: "Baby You"
2011: "On"
2012: "Love Thang"
2012: "It's Over"
2016: "My Love for You"
2017: "LYD (Love You Down)"
2018: "September Love"

References

External links

So So Def Recordings artists
20th-century African-American women singers
Living people
1976 births
Musicians from Madison, Wisconsin
21st-century African-American women singers